Live in Moscow is a live album by American rock band Stone Sour. The album features a recording of the band performing in Moscow, Russia in October 2006, video footage from this performance is featured on the special edition of their album Come What(ever) May. Live in Moscow was released on August 14, 2007, exclusive to the iTunes Store.

Track listing

Personnel

Stone Sour
 Corey Taylor − lead vocals, guitars
 James Root − lead guitar
 Josh Rand − rhythm guitar
 Shawn Economaki − bass guitar
 Roy Mayorga − drums, percussion

Technical personnel
 Victor Logachev − concert producer
 Stepan Popov − concert producer
 Dave "Shirt" Nichols − concert audio mixer
 Nina Bell − negotiations
 Roman Geigert − camera
 Dmitri Shevelev − camera
 Anna Gogichaishvili − camera
 Alexei "Siid" Tsarev − camera, editing
 Dmitri Grekulov − camera
 Dima "Brain" Zvjagin − camera
 Kiril Chapligin − coordination
 Artem Butsenko − recording and sound post-production, editing
 Dmitri Makhov − chief production

References

2007 live albums
ITunes-exclusive releases
Stone Sour albums
Roadrunner Records live albums